Heather Stewart-Whyte (born 25 September 1968) is a British model. She is the former wife of Yannick Noah.

Early life
Born in the UK, Heather Stewart-Whyte is the daughter of Doug Stewart-Whyte, a notable Tory Party activist, but was raised, along with her sisters, and by her mother. Her younger half-brother Don Stewart-Whyte, who was raised by Doug, was suspected of terrorism. She was raised on an English farm.

Career
Stewart-Whyte got her first modelling job by replying to an ad by Elite Model Management at age 17 after becoming a nanny. She did not begin modelling full-time until age 21. In the late 1980s and early 1990s, Stewart-Whyte performed runway shows for Versace, Armani, Saint-Laurent and Lagerfeld.  She also modeled for Victoria's Secret, Christian Dior, and Maybelline. Stewart-Whyte also landed magazine covers such as back-to-back September Vogue Paris in 1991 and 1992, and the British and Italian editions of both Elle and Marie Claire and French Elle.

Personal life
Stewart-Whyte became Yannick Noah's second wife in 1995, but they divorced in 1999. They had been married in Saussay. At first Stewart-Whyte was awarded custody of their two daughters in 2000, but after pregnancy-induced hospitalization during her second marriage to British record executive Dan Koonoo, Noah gained custody of their two daughters. Koonoo was known by many aliases, including Franck Ferrando and was an off and on prison detainee. Stewart-Whyte's son Stephane was born in August 2001 and Noah gained custody of the daughters in November. Noah and Stuart-Whyte lived in Europe, and custody was adjudicated in the British Courts.  Daughters Elijah and Jénayé were born in 1996 and 1997, respectively. She was stepmother to Noah's children from his prior marriage to Cécilia Rodhe: Joakim Noah and Yelena Noah. In 2003, she complained in the press that Noah had not respected her court-ordered visitation rights with daughters Elyjah and Jennaye and that he was using them to promote his album, Les Lionnes. She demanded that her children's faces be blurred in the trailer for a documentary film about Noah.

In March 2004, she was reported as kidnapped in Paris with a $60,000 ransom demand by her mother and sister, but upon her reappearance, the French Police said that she had not actually been kidnapped. Ferrando/Koonoo died at the Marcel-Cerdan boxing gym in Noisy-le-Grand at the beginning of a boxing match in July 2004. At first the cause of death was described as a heart attack, but was later determined to be a pulmonary edema.

References

External links

English female models
Living people
1968 births